Josué Abraham Lázaro Navarro  (born 29 March 1996) is a Mexican footballer who plays as a midfielder.

References

External links

1996 births
Living people
Mexican footballers
Mexican expatriate footballers
Footballers from Guadalajara, Jalisco
Association football midfielders
Santos Laguna footballers
C.D. Guadalajara footballers
Club Atlético Zacatepec players
CD Tudelano footballers
Liga MX players
Segunda División B players
Mexican expatriate sportspeople in Spain
Expatriate footballers in Spain